The 1932–33 Sussex County Football League season was the 13th in the history of the competition.

League table
The league featured 13 clubs, 12 which competed in the last season, along with one new club:
 Shoreham

League table

References

1932-33
9